Taku River/T'aḵú Téiú' Conservancy is a conservancy located in the Stikine Region of British Columbia, Canada. It was established on June 22, 2012, as a result of the Wóoshtin Wudidaa Atlin Taku Land Use Plan and Taku River Tlingit First Nation Strategic Engagement Agreement. The conservancy protects a large region of pristine wilderness along the Taku River from its confluence with the Nakina and Inklin Rivers to the Alaska-British Columbia border.

Name origin
The Tlingit name T'aḵú Téiú' means “Heart of the Taku”.

Geography
The conservancy borders the Nakina – Inklin Rivers/Yáwu Yaa Conservancy to the northeast and Tongass National Forest of Alaska to the southwest.

Bishop Falls, one of the highest waterfalls in Canada, is a prominent feature along the southeastern sloep valley.

The conservancy also protects King Salmon Lake, a small lake located at the headwaters of King Salmon Creek. The creek the longest tributary of the Taku River protected by the conservancy.

See also
Atlin/Áa Tlein Téix'i Provincial Park

References

Conservancies of British Columbia
Stikine Country